Parliamentary elections were held in Turkmenistan on 19 December 2004, with a second round in seven constituencies on 9 January 2005. A total of 131 candidates contested the 50 seats, all of whom were members of the Democratic Party of Turkmenistan, the country's sole legal party. Voter turnout was reported to be 76.88%, although in Ashgabat the low turnout prompted election officials to take the ballot boxes to people's houses.

Results

References

Turkmenistan
Elections in Turkmenistan
2004 in Turkmenistan
One-party elections
Election and referendum articles with incomplete results